Hamhung Stadium(함흥경기장) is a multi-purpose stadium in Hamhung, North Korea.  It is currently used mostly for football matches.  The stadium holds 35,000 spectators and opened in 1981.

See also 

 List of football stadiums in North Korea

References

Football venues in North Korea
Sports venues in North Korea
Multi-purpose stadiums in North Korea
Sports venues completed in 1981
Hamhung
1981 establishments in North Korea
Buildings and structures in South Hamgyong Province